15thLux Style Awards

Official Poster
July 29, 2016
 
Host:
Ahmed Ali ButtAli Zafar

Venue:
Expo Center, Karachi, Sindh

Film
Moor

Television Play:
Diyar-e-Dil

Album:
Begum Gul Bakaoli Sarfarosh  
 
←14th Lux Style Awards 16th→

The 15th Lux Style Awards ceremony, presented by Lux to honor the best in fashion, music, films, and Pakistani television in 2015, took place on 29 July 2016 at Expo Center, Karachi, Sindh, beginning at 7:30 p.m. PST. During the ceremony, LUX presented the Lux Style Awards (commonly referred to as LSA) in four segments including Film, Fashion, Television, and Music. The ceremony was televised in Pakistan by Geo Entertainment (on 20 August 2016 at 7 pm) and was produced by Lux Unilever Pakistan.

TV production and direction was done by Team NJ.

Winners and nominees
The nominees for the 15th Lux Style Awards were announced on 30 May 2016, at 9:30 p.m. PST (21:30 UTC), at the Mövenpick Hotel Karachi in Karachi, Sindh, by actors Ahmed Ali Butt, Adnan Malik, Yasir Hussain, and Mahira Khan. For the first time in Lux Style Awards history, Supporting Roles and Singing categories were introduced in the Film section. Voting lines were set open in twelve categories on 4 July 2016 and were closed on 26 July, announcing the ceremony date.

When the nominations were announced, actor Ahmed Ali Butt was nominated in the Best Actor category, however, Butt stated in a press release that his part in the film was of a supporting role and not main, with Lux also agreeing with his decision and later moved his nomination to the Supporting Actor category. Actor Danish Taimoor, who was second in line behind Butt was replaced with his nominations.

Awards
Winners are listed first in boldface:

Film

Television

Music

Fashion

See also
 4th Hum Awards

References

External links
 
 Lux Style Awards official website

Lux Style Awards ceremonies
2015 film awards
2015 television awards
2015 music awards
2016 in Pakistani cinema
2016 in Pakistani music
2016 in Pakistani television